Gamal Abdel Nasser (1918–1970) was the second President of Egypt 1954–1970.

Gamal Abdel Nasser or Jamal Abdel Nasser may also refer to:

Gamal Abdel Nasser Museum, Cairo, Egypt
Gamal Abdel Nasser Mosque, Cairo, Egypt
, an Egyptian Navy amphibious assault ship
Tobruk Airport, Libya, previously Gamal Abdel Nasser Airport
Gamal Abdel Nasser Airbase
Gamal Abdel Nasser University of Conakry, Guinea
Jamal Abdel Nasser Mosque, al-Bireh, West Bank, Palestine
Jamal Abdel Nasser Street, Gaza, Palestine

See also

Nasserism, socialist Arab nationalist political ideology based on the thinking of Gamal Abdel Nasser